Tumhare Hain is a Pakistani romantic drama series, produced by Wajahat Rauf and his wife Shazia Wajahat under their production house banner Showcase Production. The drama aired weekly on ARY Digital every Monday. It stars Sarah Khan, Agha Ali and Rabab Hashim in lead roles.

Cast
Agha Ali as Rayan
Sarah Khan as Aania
Rabab Hashim as Zoya
Ahmed Hassan as Kamil
Hassan Ahmed as Danial
Sumaiyya Bukhsh as Anum
Behroze Sabzwari as Jibran (Rayan’s Father)
Huma Nawab as Kiran (Rayan’s Mother)
Shaheen Khan as Fozia (Danial’s Mother)
Birjees Farooqui as Sameera (Zoya’s Mother)

Accolades

References

2017 Pakistani television series debuts